The Stearman 4 is an American commercial biplane that was manufactured in the 1920s by Stearman Aircraft. They were marketed at the time as fast and luxurious executive transports and mail planes for about US$16,000.

Development
Stearman Aircraft developed the Model 4 from the C3, adding a deeper fuselage and offering a range of more powerful engines. These features enabled the Model 4 to carry heavier cargo loads. Being larger than the C3, but smaller than the M-2 and LT-1 models, it filled a gap in the Stearman product line. Designer Lloyd Stearman said that it was the best airplane he ever designed. Heaters were provided for both cockpits.

Operational history

Stearman sold the Model 4 to commercial operators in the United States, building 41 before ending production. Users of the type included Varney Air Lines and American Airways (later American Airlines). Standard Oil operated three Junior Speedmails for product promotion. The aircraft was produced in Wichita, Kansas from September 1929 to August 1930.

In Canada, Trans-Canada Air Lines (later Air Canada) bought three Stearman for pilot training and surveying new routes and were used from 1937 to 1939. One of them was sold in March 1939.

1930s socialite aviator Aline Rhonie flew NC796H (which still exists but is now registered as NC774H) out of Long Island, New York, before later joining the British war effort with the Air Transport Auxiliary.

The aircraft's rugged construction helped it survive heavy handling and loads, and thirteen remained on the U.S. Civil Register in 1965. Several were operated as crop dusters, with their forward mail compartment converted into a hopper. Many later passed to private owners of veteran planes and are airworthy or in museums.

Variants

The first letter of the designation refers to the engine while an M indicates that it was intended as a mailplane, with the forward compartment covered. Minor modifications were made to the design which were reflected in the use of -1 after the designation.
Reference: Simpson
4-C/C-4/C-4A Junior Speedmail (Approved Type Certificate (ATC) 304)
powered by  Wright J6-9 radial, 10 built.
4-CM Senior Speedmail (ATC 325)
Single seat mailplane version of the 4-C. 15 built including three converted from 4-Cs.
4-D Junior Speedmail (ATC 305)
First certified aircraft with the then new  Pratt & Whitney Wasp Junior, 8 were built, including 1 as 4-DX.
4-DX Junior Speedmail (ATC 2-406)
One built with a  Pratt & Whitney Wasp S1A and a canopy over both cockpits.
4-DM Senior Speedmail (ATC 326)
 Single seat mailplane version of the 4-D. Two built, both converted from other models.
4-E/C4W Junior Speedmail (ATC 292)
 Pratt & Whitney C-1 Wasp or  Pratt & Whitney Wasp 11 built. 
4-EX Senior Speedmail (ATC 2-279)
One customized 4-E built for Standard Oil with a  Pratt & Whitney Wasp SC.
4-EM Senior Speedmail (ATC 322)
Single seat mailplane version of the 4-E.
4-RM Special (no ATC issued)
One 4-CM was converted into a four seater and powered by a  Ranger GV-770.
Model 80 Sportster (ATC 504)
1933 one-off custom two-seater with dual controls and an enclosed canopy for the rear cockpit, with a  Pratt & Whitney Wasp Junior T3A engine.
Model 81 (ATC 504)
One built as a trainer variant of the 80 with enclosed canopy over both cockpits. Sold to the Mexican government after a tour of South America while on floats.

Operators

 Canadian Airways - 4
 Northern Airways

 American Airlines
 Department of Commerce Airways branch (4-C)
 Fenstra Steel (4-C)
 Pratt & Whitney (4-D)
 Richfield Oil Company
 Texaco (4-D as number 14)
 Varney Air Lines
 Western Air Express (4-D)

Survivors

 c/n 4005 4-E Junior Speedmail N663K - privately owned, in National Air Tour markings.
 c/n 4007 4-E Junior Speedmail NC667K  - delivered in 1929 to the Richfield Oil Company as the "Jimmie Allen Flying Club" flagship and used until 1937. Following a 2007 restoration, it flies on the North American air show circuit and in 2013 won the Sun 'n Fun Grand Champion - Antique award.
 c/n 4021 4-EM Senior Speedmail CF-AMB - displayed at the Canada Aviation and Space Museum in Ottawa, Ontario.
 c/n 4022 4-CM Junior Speedmail NC785H - privately owned, flown in Standard Oil Stanavo colors.
 c/n 4025 4-D Junior Speedmail NC774H - privately owned, flown in Western Air Express colors.
 c/n 4026 4-E Junior Speedmail N11224 - displayed at the Yanks Air Museum in Chino, California.
 c/n 4027 4-D Junior Speedmail N563Y - displayed at the Kansas Aviation Museum in Wichita, Kansas in Texaco markings.
 c/n 4033 4-DM Senior Speedmail NC485W - built as a 4-CM and re-engined, privately owned, flown in American Airways colors.
 c/n 4036 4-CM-1 Senior Speedmail - NC488W privately owned, flown in Standard Oil Stanavo colors.
 c/n 4037 4-CM-1 Junior Speedmail NC489W - privately owned, flown in Standard Oil Stanavo colors.
 c/n 4040 4-C Junior Speedmail N11722 - privately owned.

Specifications (4-E)

See also

References

Citations

Bibliography

External links

Stearman 4-EM Senior Speedmail
The Stearman 4-D Jr. Speedmail
Stearman 4-C ATC
Stearman 4-D ATC
Stearman 4-E ATC

1930s United States mailplanes
4
Biplanes
Single-engined tractor aircraft
Aircraft first flown in 1930